Xeronema callistemon is a species of flowering plant endemic to the Poor Knights Islands and Taranga Island in the north of New Zealand. It was discovered in 1924 and has a common name Poor Knights lily. The plant is listed as vulnerable in the 1997 IUCN Red List of Plants, but as of October 2010 is not listed in the IUCN Red List of Threatened Species.

Etymology
The common name of the plant originates from the Poor Knights Islands on which it was discovered. The islands, in turn, were so named because of their similarity in shape to the Poor Knights Pudding – a bread-based dish popular at the time of their discovery by Europeans.

The botanical species name means "with a beautiful stamen", referring to the prominent red stamens of the plant's flowers.

Structure
The green stalks of Xeronema callistemon start growing vertically, initially sheathed by overlapping leaves. As the flower emerges, the stalk then turn sideways, growing a red flower raceme with prominent red stamens tipped with orange pollen and resembles a giant bottlebrush or toothbrush.

Habitat

Xeronema callistemon usually grows on rhyolite sea cliffs and rocky outcrops and sometimes in forest. It requires much water and is pollinated by birds and butterflies. If its seed falls on a nearby tree, such as Metrosideros excelsa, then it may grow as an epiphyte on it. The species has no obvious natural enemies and is listed as vulnerable because it grows naturally only on two islands. These islands are protected by the New Zealand Government as nature reserves and have a limited access. However, the plant is becoming popular for cultivation in private gardens. A related species, Xeronema moorei, is found on the islands of New Caledonia, 1500 km to the northwest.

Growth
Plants grow from fresh falling seeds. Although they germinate easily, it might take 10–15 years for them to grow into the flowering size. They flower between September and December, peaking in October (spring in New Zealand).

References

Xeronemataceae
Flora of New Zealand
Plants described in 1924